Povington Priory was a Benedictine priory in Tyneham, Dorset, England.

It was established as an alien priory of the Abbey of Bec. This term could mean simply an estate and does not necessarily imply the presence on the property of even a small conventual monastic house.

In England Bec possessed in the 15th century several priories, namely, St Neots, Stoke-by-Clare, Wilsford,   Steventon, Cowick,  Ogbourne,  and at some point also Blakenham Priory. St Neots Priory was particularly large.  In Wales Bec also had  Goldcliff Priory, in Monmouthshire.

The London suburb of Tooting Bec takes its name from the medieval village's having been a possession of Bec Abbey.

Wool and English ewe's milk cheese produced at Povington were shipped to the Mother House via the docks at Wareham.

Following the dissolution of the alien priories, the lands were granted to St Anthony's Hospital, North Cheam.

References

Reading

 Marjorie Chibnall, The English Lands of the Abbey of Bec,  Oxford University Press, Oxford, 1946.

Monasteries in Dorset
Alien priories in England